The Macao Orchestra also known as the Macau Orchestra is a professional orchestra based in the Chinese special administrative region of Macao. Consisting of approximately 60 members from Asia, Europe, North America and Australia, the orchestra performs symphonic, chamber, and educational concerts around Macau. The orchestra also tours mainland China two or three times per year and in 2007 performed in Jakarta, Indonesia.

In Macau, the orchestra performs at the Macau Cultural Centre, San Domingo Church, Macau Tower and Dom Pedro V Theatre.  The orchestra is run as a division of the Macau Cultural Institute (Instituto Cultural), the arts arm of the Macau government.

Formed in 1983 by Father Aureo de Castro as the Macao Chamber Orchestra, the orchestra underwent a series of reviews and expansions, becoming a full-time professional ensemble in 2003.  The current Musical Director and Principal conductor is Lü Jia (呂嘉), who has held this position since the beginning of the 2008–09. Lü Jia's predecessor, En Shao (邵恩) (2003–2008),  was the  first Music Director and Principal Conductor of the Macao Orchestra in its present form.

Soloists who have appeared with the orchestra include Lang Lang, Yundi Li, Valentina Igoshina and Pinchas Zukerman.

External links
Macao Orchestra Official Website
List of Symphony Orchestras in Greater China -PRC. HKSAR. Macao SAR and Taiwan

China orchestras
Musical groups established in 1983